This is a list of members of the 28th Legislative Assembly of Queensland from 1938 to 1941, as elected at the 1938 state election held on 2 April 1938.

 On 2 March 1939, the Labor member for Charters Towers, William Wellington, died. Labor candidate Arthur Jones won the resulting by-election on 27 May 1939.
 On 24 March 1939, the Labor member for Gregory, George Pollock, died. Independent candidate Charles Brown won the resulting by-election on 27 May 1939.
 On 27 March 1939, the Labor member for Townsville, Maurice Hynes, died. Labor candidate George Keyatta won the resulting by-election on 27 May 1939.
 On 31 August 1940, the Labor member for Merthyr, James Keogh, died. Labor candidate Bill Moore won the resulting by-election on 9 November 1940.
 On 17 September 1940, the Labor member for Herbert and Deputy Premier of Queensland, Percy Pease, died. Labor candidate Stephen Theodore won the resulting by-election on 9 November 1940.

See also
1938 Queensland state election
Forgan Smith Ministry (Labor) (1932–1942)

References

 Waterson, D.B. Biographical register of the Queensland Parliament, 1930-1980 Canberra: ANU Press (1982)
 

Members of Queensland parliaments by term
20th-century Australian politicians